The "second Ruhr" was a World War II area that included the "southern regions of Germany, the plateau of Bohemia, and Silesia" where Nazi Germany military production was dispersed away from Allied bomber bases in England.  After Allied Operation Pointblank bombing of German aircraft facilities had begun, Nazi Germany dispersed the 27 larger aircraft works across 729 medium and very small plants (some in tunnels, caves, and mines), and oil production was also dispersed (e.g., Blechhammer).  However, by October 1943, long-range bombers could reach the area (e.g., Marienburg).

References

World War II sites of Nazi Germany
World War II strategic bombing